Teton Pass is a high mountain pass in the western United States, located at the southern end of the Teton Range in western Wyoming, between Wilson and Victor, Idaho. To the south of the pass lies the Snake River Range.

The Teton Pass highway in Wyoming is designated as State Highway 22 and the pass is approximately  out of Jackson. The maximum grade on the road is 10%, and several avalanche slide paths traverse the road along its length, including Glory Bowl slide area. During the winter months, the road is often closed in the early mornings for avalanche control by the Wyoming Department of Transportation. The area is popular for backcountry skiing, snowboarding, and mountain biking.

The pass is a few miles south of Grand Teton National Park; parts of the route to the pass are located in the Caribou-Targhee National Forest and in the Bridger-Teton National Forest. The small town of Wilson sits at the base of the east side of the pass, while Teton Village and the Jackson Hole Mountain Resort ski area are northeast of the pass.

Cited references

External links
Wyoming Department of Transportation webcam for Teton Pass

Mountain passes of Wyoming
Mountain passes of Teton County, Wyoming
Transportation in Teton County, Wyoming